Major General Stephen Newman "Steve" Gower,  (born 10 June 1940) is a retired Australian Army officer and former director of the Australian War Memorial (AWM). During his time in the Army he saw combat as an artillery forward observer during the Vietnam War in 1966 and 1967. He is also the author of the books Guns of the Regiment (1981) and Options for an Australian Defence Technological Strategy (1982).

Early life
Gower was born on 10 June 1940 in Adelaide, South Australia, to Allan Martin and Agnes Fanny Gower. Educated at Unley High School and Prince Alfred College, he entered the Royal Military College, Duntroon in 1959. On graduation in 1961, he received a commission as a lieutenant in the Royal Australian Artillery. Gower wed Heather Eunice on 3 July 1965; the couple have one daughter.

AWM Director

Gower was appointed the Director of the Australian War Memorial in 1996. He continued in this role until November 2011 when he took full-time carer's leave. Nola Anderson served as acting director until December 2012 when Brendan Nelson became the new director of the institution.

Bibliography

Books

References

1940 births
Military personnel from South Australia
Australian generals
Australian military historians
Australian military personnel of the Vietnam War
Australian public servants
Living people
Officers of the Order of Australia
People from Adelaide
University of Adelaide alumni
Royal Military College, Duntroon graduates
Australian War Memorial